The 2010 World Snooker Championship (officially the 2010 Betfred.com World Snooker Championship) was a professional snooker tournament that took place between 17 April and 3 May 2010 at the Crucible Theatre in Sheffield, England. The final ranking event of the 2009-10 snooker season, it was the 34th year that the World Snooker Championship had been held at the Crucible, first held in 1927. The event was organised by the World Professional Billiards and Snooker Association and had a total prize fund of £1,111,000, with £250,000 going to the winner of the event.  The tournament was sponsored by sports betting company Betfred.

John Higgins was the defending champion, but lost in the second round 11–13 to Steve Davis. Neil Robertson won the event after a 18–13 win over Graeme Dott in the final. In winning the event, Robertson was the second player from outside of the British Isles to win the event in the modern era of snooker, and the first Australian to win the event since the disputed 1952 World Snooker Championship which contained only Australian players. There was 60 century breaks made during the event, the highest being a 146 made by both Dott and Mark Allen.

Overview
The World Snooker Championship is an annual cue sport tournament and the official world championship of the game of snooker. Invented in the late 19th century by British Army soldiers stationed in India, the sport was popular in Great Britain. In modern times it has been played worldwide, especially in East and Southeast Asian nations such as China, Hong Kong and Thailand.

In the 2010 tournament, 32 professional players competed in one-on-one snooker matches played over several , using a single-elimination tournament format. The 32 players were selected for the event using the snooker world rankings and a pre-tournament qualification competition. In 1927, the first world championship was won by Joe Davis. The event's final took place in Camkin's Hall, Birmingham, England. Since 1977, the event has been held at the Crucible Theatre in Sheffield, England. The event was organised by the World Professional Billiards and Snooker Association. Scotsman John Higgins was the defending champion, having defeated Shaun Murphy 18–9 in the previous year's final. The event was sponsored by sports betting company Betfred.

Format
The 2011 World Snooker Championship took place from 17 April to 3 May 2011 in Sheffield, England. The tournament was the last of six ranking events in the 2009–10 snooker season on the World Snooker Tour. It featured a 32-player main draw that was held at the Crucible Theatre, as well as a qualifying draw that was played at the World Snooker Academy in Sheffield from 26 February to 9 March. This was the 34th consecutive year that the tournament had been staged at the Crucible. The main stages of the event were broadcast by the BBC in the United Kingdom.

The top 16 players in the latest world rankings automatically qualified for the main draw as seeded players. Higgins was seeded first overall as the defending champion, and the remaining 15 seeds were allocated based on the latest world rankings. The number of frames required to win a match increased throughout the tournament. The first round consisted of best-of-19-frames matches, with the final match being played over a maximum of 35 frames. All 16 non-seeded spots in the main draw were filled with players from the qualifying rounds. The draw for the televised stage of the World Championship was made on Thursday, 11 March 2010 at 11 a.m. GMT.

Prize fund
The breakdown of prize money for this year is shown below:

Winner: £250,000
Runner-up: £125,000
Semi-final: £52,000
Quarter-final: £24,050
Last 16: £16,000
Last 32: £12,000
Last 48: £8,200
Last 64: £4,600

Stage one highest break: £1,000
Stage two highest break: £10,000
Stage one maximum break: £5,000
Stage two maximum break: £147,000
Total: £1,111,000

Tournament summary
 As part of Barry Hearn’s vision for the future of the game, walk-on music for the players was introduced. It is now universally done for all players qualifying in the tournaments, although for most tournaments, it is only used in the latter stages of tournaments, due to disparate starting times for other matches in the main arena.

First round
Debutants at the Crucible were Tom Ford and Zhang Anda. It was also the first time that Zhang has qualified for the main event of any ranking event. Ford played against Mark Allen and Zhang against Stephen Hendry, losing 4–10 and 9–10 respectively.
Leo Scullion refereed at the Crucible for the first time in his career.
Steve Davis qualified for the World Championship for a record 30th and final time, spanning over five different decades since his first appearance in 1979. He defeated Mark King 10–9 in the first round, making him the oldest man since Eddie Charlton in 1989 to win a match at the Crucible.
Four out of the sixteen seeded players lost their first-round matches. Mark King lost 9–10 against Steve Davis, Marco Fu lost 9–10 against Martin Gould, Peter Ebdon lost 5–10 against Graeme Dott and Ryan Day lost 8–10 against Mark Davis.

Second round
Steve Davis aged 52 years old defeated the defending champion John Higgins 13–11. With this he reached the quarter-finals of the World Championship for the first time since 2005, and at 52 years old became the oldest player to reach the quarter-finals since Eddie Charlton who was 53 in 1983.
In the same match Higgins made his 100th century break at the Crucible, becoming only the second player after Stephen Hendry to reach this milestone. It was a break of 115 and it came in the 18th frame of the match.
Meanwhile, Neil Robertson came back from 0–6 and 5–11 to defeat Martin Gould 13–12.
Mark Allen made the first 146 break in the history of the Crucible during his match against Mark Davis.

25th anniversary rematch of the 1985 final
Steve Davis and Dennis Taylor played a one-frame exhibition match on 29 April, marking the 25th anniversary of the 1985 World Championship final which saw Taylor defeat Davis 18–17 on the final black.
In the re-creation, all but one of their attempts to recreate missed shots on black failed, which means the black was potted on each occasion and Taylor's attempt to recreate the frame-winning ball also went wrong.

Semi-finals
Robertson defeated Ali Carter 17–12, becoming the first player from outside the UK or Ireland since Cliff Thorburn in 1983- and the first Australian since Eddie Charlton in 1975- to reach the final of the World Championship, and the first Australian finalist at the Crucible.
Graeme Dott beat Mark Selby 17–14, to reach his third final after also doing so in 2004 and 2006.

Final
Before the start of the final it was announced that provisional world No. 1 John Higgins had been suspended by the WPBSA following a News of the World story alleging that he had agreed to lose frames in future tournaments in return for money.
The final was between Scot Graeme Dott and Australian Neil Robertson, marking the first time since 2003 that no English player appeared in the final.
Robertson won the title, having defeated only one top sixteen player during the tournament. In the first round he beat Fergal O'Brien (No. 31), in the second round Martin Gould (No. 46), in the quarter-final Steve Davis (No. 23) and in the final he beat Graeme Dott (No. 28). Robertson's only match with a top-sixteen player was in the semi-finals, where he beat Ali Carter (No. 5) decisively.
Robertson became the first Australian to win the title in the modern era, and only the second after Horace Lindrum, who won the controversial 1952 championship. Robertson also became the first player from outside Britain and Ireland to win the title since Canada's Cliff Thorburn in 1980 and the first non-British player to win the title since Ireland's Ken Doherty in 1997.
Robertson hoped his win would help lift the low profile of snooker in his home country, a prospect supported by a number of local sports promoters.

Main draw
Shown below are the results for each round. The numbers in parentheses beside some of the players are their seeding ranks (each championship has 16 seeds and 16 qualifiers).

Qualification

Preliminary qualifying
The preliminary qualifying rounds for the tournament took place on 26 February 2010 at the English Institute of Sport in Sheffield. (WPBSA members not on The Tour.)

Round 1

Round 2

Qualifying
The first four qualifying rounds for the tournament took place between 27 February and 5 March at the English Institute of Sport in Sheffield. The final round took place between 7 and 9 March at the same venue.

Round 1

Rounds 2–5

Century breaks

Televised stage centuries 
There were 60 centuries in the televised stage of the World Championship.

 146, 131, 122, 101, 100  Mark Allen
 146, 130, 127, 116, 115, 112, 110, 105  Graeme Dott
 142, 117, 108, 106, 104, 103  Mark Selby
 140, 124, 116, 112, 107, 106, 104  Neil Robertson
 137, 120, 103  Ding Junhui
 128, 108, 100  Shaun Murphy
 128, 102  Steve Davis
 127, 103  Liang Wenbo
 127  Stephen Lee
 122, 104, 100  Ali Carter
 121, 115, 114, 106  John Higgins
 121  Stephen Hendry
 120, 114  Stephen Maguire
 117, 111, 108, 106, 104, 100  Ronnie O'Sullivan
 116, 103, 102  Martin Gould
 115  Mark Williams
 112  Michael Holt
 112  Marco Fu
 107  Tom Ford

Qualifying stage centuries 
There were 50 century breaks in the qualifying stage of the World Championship.

 140  James Wattana
 139, 100  Mark Joyce
 138, 133, 121, 101  Bjorn Haneveer
 137, 104  Matthew Stevens
 137, 103  Jimmy White
 134, 114, 113, 103, 101  Zhang Anda
 134  David Gray
 133  Barry Hawkins
 132, 121  Rod Lawler
 132, 120, 100  Tom Ford
 131, 126, 105  Michael White
 131, 104  Chris Norbury
 129, 114  Martin Gould
 129  Nigel Bond
 128, 113, 104  Adrian Gunnell
 116, 103  Brendan O'Donoghue
 116, 100  Mark Davis
 115, 103  Craig Steadman
 108  Jamie Cope
 107  Tony Drago
 105  Joe Jogia
 104  Matthew Couch
 103  Sam Baird
 103  Anthony Hamilton
 102  Xiao Guodong
 101  Jimmy Robertson
 101  Alan McManus
 100  Li Hang

Notelist

References

World Snooker Championships
World Championship
World Snooker Championship
Sports competitions in Sheffield
World Snooker Championship
World Snooker Championship